BHV may refer to:

 Black Heart Village, a Hip-Hop collective from Baton Rouge, Louisiana, formed in 2017 
 Brussels-Halle-Vilvoorde, a former Belgian electoral and judicial district
 Bazar de l'Hôtel de Ville, a department store in Paris, France
 Bovine herpesvirus (disambiguation), a group of viruses
 Bahawalpur Airport